Big News Network is an international news agency founded in 1998. The agency is currently headquartered in Dubai Media City in Dubai, UAE with administrative offices in Sydney. Big News Network operates multiple news portals distinct to the regions, nations and major cities around the world. The agency is in strategic alliance and conglomeration with Midwest Radio Network and Mainstream Media.

Operational history
Big News Network was established as a news search engine in the United States, in 1998, by Hayden Enterprises. The group was acquired in 2000, by an Australian-owned interests, to originate news content for the establishment of a global directory of news portals with the News.Net extension. News.Net is a network of region specific news portals, founded in 1999 by Mainstream Media. In 2003, Bignewsnetwork.com was renovated and relaunched, becoming the flagship portal of the agency. Later that year, News.Net was acquired as an associate news distribution platform of the agency. eNewspapers, a collection of international newspapers from around the world, was launched in 2004. Later in 2004, Big News Network received operational license as a news agency by the Dubai Government within the Gulf Cooperation Council at which time it was incorporated in the UAE as Big News Network FZ LLC.

Today, Big News Network is an international conglomerate of global news distribution systems consisting of three platforms, Bignewsnetwork.com, News.Net directory of sites and  eNewspapers network. Mainstream Media, a United Kingdom based digital news media organization, administers News.Net in conjunction with Big News Network. The eNewspapers platform of the agency is regulated by Midwest Radio Network, an Australian broadcasting and digital media company, on behalf of Big News Network. Big News Network is also among the largest shareholders in Ireland's national radio station iRadio.

In 2020, the non-governmental organization EU DisinfoLab found that the Big News Network was part of "network of 500+ fake local media in 95 countries that have helped reproduce negative iterations about Pakistan (or China)".

Recognitions

News distribution network

News.Net

Regional news distribution
 The Africa News.Net – dedicated to the coverage of news related to the African Continent 
 The Asia News.Net –  focused on Asia
 Asia Pacific News.Net – covers Japan, Philippines, Korea, China, Taiwan and Pacific nations
 Britain News.Net – Great Britain site with main focus on England
 Caribbean News.Net – focuses on individual island nations in the Caribbean Sea
 Central Africa News.Net – includes stories of individual countries
 Central America News.Net – covers El Salvador, Honduras, Nicaragua, Panama, Guatemala, Costa Rica and Belize
 Central Asia News.Net – covers states bounded by the Caspian Sea, China, Russia and Afghanistan
 Europe News.Net – covers news from across the European Union 
 Latin America News.Net – covers Latin American nations
 Mediterranean News.Net – chronicles countries alongside the Sea
 Middle East News.Net – dedicated to the Mideast and GCC countries
 North America News.Net – covers Canada, Mexico and the United States 
 Scandinavia News.Net – monitors Denmark, Norway and Sweden
 South America News.Net – covers entire continent of South America
 Southeast Asia News.Net – Southeast Asia news site
 US News.Net –  focused on the United States

National news distribution

 Afghanistan News.Net – historical news site recognized by the Library of Congress
 Argentina News.Net – publishes news for and about the Argentine Republic
 Australian News.Net – group's first site, came online in 1999
 Austria News.Net – major news emanates the capital Vienna
 Azerbaijan News.Net – provides coverage of Central Asia and its largest country
 Bahamas News.Net – portal servicing the Bahamas and the capital Nassau
 Bahrain News.Net – site dedicated to the company's country of incorporation
 Bangladesh News.Net – comprehensive news resource serving Bangladesh in South Asia
 Barbados News.Net – reporting principally about the capital Bridgetown
 Belgium News.Net – continuous news from this Western Europe nation
 Brazil News.Net – displays extensive news coverage from across Brazil
 Brunei News.Net – one of the company's earlier sites, covers Brunei in Southeast Asia
 Cambodia News.Net – includes coverage of the region as well as the Kingdom of Cambodia
 Canada News.Net – publishes news from around the provinces, cities and the country
 China News.Net – extensive news reports from around China and key cities
 Chile News.Net – national news with a focus on the capital Santiago
 The Cuba News.Net – decade-old site covering Cuba, its largest city and capital Havana
 Denmark News.Net – national news with a main focus on Copenhagen 
 Dominican Republic News.Net – publishes news of the capital Santo Domingo and the country
 Egypt News.Net – frequented news site covering Egypt  
 El Salvador News.Net – current news of El Salvador and its capital San Salvador
 France News.Net – portal focused on the largest country in Western Europe
 The Fiji News.Net – one of the few independent news portals covering Fiji 
 Finland News.Net – publishes news of the nation and Helsinki
 Germany News.Net – online publication dedicated to the world's fourth largest economy
 Greece News.Net – stories from Athens and Thessaloniki
 Guatemala News.Net – covers the country and the capital Guatemala City
 Haiti News.Net – updates news from around Haiti and the Caribbean
 Honduras News.Net – generates current news from Tegucigalpa and the rest of the republic  
 India's News.Net – news portal servicing the world's second most populous country
 Indonesia News.Net – purveyor of national news from Indonesia since 1999
 The Iran News.Net – long-established publication focused on the Islamic Republic 
 Iraq News.Net – reporting the news prior to, and since, the March 2003 invasion 
 Ireland News.Net – covers Ireland and news of Irish interest from around the world
 Israel News.Net – relaying news about the Jewish state and the Middle East region since 2000
 The Italy News.Net – features all the news from this country in Southern Europe 
 Jamaica News.Net – produces online news for the nation and its capital Kingston
 The Japan News.Net – long-established site servicing Japan and East Asia
 Jordan News.Net – publishes news from this Arab kingdom on the Jordan River
 Kazakhstan News.Net – regional resource focused on the republic 
 Kenya News.Net – relays national news from around the nation and East Africa
 Kuwait News.Net – relevant news from this Gulf Country
 Kyrgyzstan News.Net – coverage of Kyrgyzstan with a particular emphasis on Bishkek
 Laos News.Net – focal point for this site is Vientiane, the capital
 Lebanon News.Net – national news service for Lebanon in the East Mediterranean
 Liberia News.Net – publishing news to English-speaking Liberia and its capital Monrovia 
 Malaysia News.Net – concentrates on Malaysia in Southeast Asia
 Mexico News.Net – delivers news about Mexico to national and global readers
 Mongolia News.Net – established in 1999, this site covers the country and the capital Ulan Bator
 Morocco News.Net – from North Africa covers the country's capital Rabat and largest city Casablanca 
 Myanmar News.Net – legacy site for Myanmar (Burma), established in 1999
 Nepal News.Net – streams news from this landlocked nation in South Asia
 Netherlands News.Net – composite site with breaking news from Amsterdam and The Hague 
 New Zealand News.Net – focuses on the capital Wellington and the country's largest city Auckland 
 Nigerian News.Net – serves Nigeria in West Africa, the capital Abuja and largest city Lagos 
 North Korean News.Net – long-time resource for news about North Korea
 Northern Ireland News.Net – news service for NI and major cities
 Oman News.Net – articles about the sultanate and capital Muscat
 Pakistan News.Net – 1999 vintage portal devoted to Pakistan in South Asia
 Palestinian News.Net – taking in happenings in Ramallah and Gaza since 2000
 Philippines News.Net – oldest Philippines online news site on the Web
 Qatar News.Net – breaking news from Qatar and its capital Doha
 Russia News.Net – national news resource for the world's largest country geographically
 Saudi Arabia News.Net – breaks news from Saudi Arabia and the Arabian Peninsula
 Sierra Leone News.Net – updates Sierra Leone news and headlines from West Africa
 Singapore News.Net – provides current headlines from around the country
 South Africa News.Net – resource for news about the country, Johannesburg, Cape Town and Pretoria
 South Korea News.Net – encompasses the southern half of the Korean Peninsula with news primarily from Seoul
 Spain News.Net – dedicated to Spain and bigger cities including Barcelona and the capital Madrid
 Sri Lankan News.Net – covering Sri Lanka formerly known as Ceylon in South Asia
 Sudan News.Net – focusing on Sudan with major stories from Khartoum
 Sweden News.Net – presents news from Stockholm, Sweden and Scandinavia
 Switzerland News.Net – tracks Swiss news from around the nation's bigger cities 
 Syria News.Net – reports news from across the war-torn nation
 Taiwan's News.Net – extends to the Taiwan borders and takes in Taipei 
 Tajikistan News.Net – reporting from and about the lands of the Tajiks since 1999
 Thailand News.Net – comprehensive source for news for this South Asian nation
 Trinidad News.Net – national news provider for the twin-island nation of Trinidad and Tobago 
 The Turkey News.Net – coverage extends from the capital Ankara to the country's biggest city Istanbul 
 Turkmenistan News.Net – focuses on Turkmenistan in Central Asia
 UAE News.Net – covers the seven emirates 
 Uganda News.Net – news service for the Republic of Uganda from Kampala
 United Kingdom News.Net – coverage of England, Scotland, Wales) and Northern Ireland
 United States News.Net – national site covering the country and its major cities
 Uzbekistan News.Net – established 8 years after Uzbekistan separated from the Soviet Union
 Venezuela News.Net – frequented Venezuelan news site with coverage of Caracas
 Vietnam News.Net – serving the capital Hanoi and largest city Ho Chi Minh City
 Yemen News.Net – a digest of news of the country and the capital Sana’a
 Zambia News.Net – displays current news from Zambia in southern Africa with a key focus on Lusaka
 Zimbabwe News.Net – covering Zimbabwe and the capital Harare

International city wise news distribution

 Abu Dhabi News.Net – portal updating news from the UAE capital
 Adelaide News.Net – purveyor of news for the South Australian capital
 Amsterdam News.Net – focuses on the Dutch capital with a broader national perspective
 Athens News.Net – covers Greece's capital and largest city
 Auckland News.Net – updating news from the city and across the Auckland metropolitan area
 Bangkok News.Net – reports from the city and the wider Bangkok Metropolitan Region
 Barcelona News.Net – services Barcelona, Spain's second largest city
 Beijing News.Net –news from around Beijing supplemented by national coverage
 Beirut News.Net – digital newspaper for the Lebanon capital
 Belfast News.Net – updating news about the city and Northern Ireland
 Berlin News.Net – displays news of Germany's capital
 Blue Mountains News.Net – includes news from the NSW Central West
 Bombay News.Net – established in 1999 this site covers Bombay and the broader state of Maharashtra
 Brisbane News.Net – presents current news from Brisbane, Australia
 Buenos Aires News.Net – publisher of news about the city and the Greater Buenos Aires area
 Cairo News.Net – covers the city of Cairo and national stories from across Egypt
 Calcutta News.Net – comprehensive site for Calutta and West Bengal
 Calgary News.Net – covering the area east of the Canadian Rockies
 Canberra News.Net – covers the city, the ACT and the nation
 Cape Town News.Net – servicing the legislative capital of South Africa 
 Cardiff News.Net – services the city and Wales
 Christchurch News.Net – breaking news from this New Zealand city
 Copenhagen News.Net – local news site with additional reporting from around Denmark
 Delhi News.Net – focuses on Delhi, India's largest city 
 Dubai News.Net – extensive news resource for Dubai and the United Arab Emirates
 Dublin News.Net – breaks news from the city of Dublin and Ireland
 Edinburgh News.Net – online news site devoted to Edinburgh, the capital of Scotland 
 Edmonton News.Net – coverage extends to the province (Alberta)
 Glasgow News.Net – all the news from Scotland's largest city
 Havana News.Net – coverage of the city and Cuba
 Hobart News.Net – stories from and about the city and Tasmania
 Hong Kong News.Net – relays news of Hong Kong and Mainland China
 Jakarta News.Net – serving the Indonesian capital and largest city
 Johannesburg News.Net –portal concentrating on Joburg and South Africa
 Karachi News.Net – servicing the largest metropolitan city in Pakistan 
 Kingston News.Net – city news and national Jamaican coverage
 Kolkata News.Net – displays news from the city with additional coverage of India
 Kuala Lumpur News.Net – includes local city, national, regional and international news
 The London News.Net –news portal servicing the city, England and the UK
 Macau News.Net – publication focused on Macau, includes headlines from China
 Madrid News.Net – digest of news from the Spanish capital
 Manchester News.Net – purveyor of news from the city and Greater Manchester
 Manila News.Net – historic site covering the Philippines capital and Metro Manila
 Melbourne News.Net – news of the city, the state of Victoria, and Australia
 Mexico City News.Net – coverage of Mexico City, the nation and region
 Montreal News.Net – publishes news from the largest city in Quebec
 Moscow News.Net – online news site devoted to the Russian capital 
 Mumbai News.Net –updates news from metropolitan Mumbai and surrounds
 New Delhi News.Net – capital of India news portal, online since 1999
 Osaka News.Net –coverage of the third largest city in Japan
 Ottawa News.Net – chronicles news about the Canadian capital
 Quebec News.Net – includes news of Quebec City and Canada
 Paris News.Net –news from this global city on the River Seine in the north of France
 Perth News.Net – covers the city with news of Western Australia and the nation at large
 Rio de Janeiro News.Net – publication concentrating on the city and state of Rio de Janeiro
 Sao Paulo News.Net – publishes stories from the most populous city in Brazil
 Scotland News.Net – news from major cities Aberdeen, Edinburgh the capital, and Glasgow
 Seoul News.Net – online news site covering the capital city of South Korea
 Shanghai News.Net – provides news from Shanghai, the most populous city in China
 St Petersburg News.Net – news portal focusing on the second largest city in Russia
 StockholmNews.Net – presents local and national news from the largest city in Sweden and Scandinavia
 Sydney News.Net – historic site concentrates on Australia's biggest city
 Taipei News.Net – headlines news about Taipei and from across Taiwan
 Tasmania News.Net – covers the island state and its major cities
 Tel Aviv News.Net – regular news delivery of the city and the nation
 The Tokyo News.Net – publisher of news about the Greater Tokyo Area, the largest metropolis in the world
 Toronto News.Net – updates news from Toronto, and Canada
 Vancouver News.Net – covers the city, the Greater Vancouver area and British Columbia
 Wellington News.Net – presents news from the New Zealand capital
 Winnipeg News.Net – of interest to residents of the city and Manitoba

U.S. city news distribution

 Albuquerque News.Net – local news resource for the most populous city in New Mexico
 Atlanta News.Net – the company's oldest U.S. news site, covers Atlanta in Georgia
 Atlantic City News.Net – conveys news from Atlantic City, New Jersey
 Austin News.Net – breaks local news from the Texas capital
 Baltimore News.Net – headlines from the city and county of Baltimore, Maryland
 Baton Rouge News.Net – portal focused on the capital of Louisiana
 Birmingham News.Net – news resource for Birmingham, Alabama
 Boston News.Net – updates news from the Massachusetts capital
 Buffalo NY News.Net – reports from Buffalo in the state of New York
 Charlotte News.Net – portal for the largest city in North Carolina
 Chicago News.Net – covers the city, Illinois and the American Midwest
 Cincinnati News.Net – online news site for Cincinnati, Ohio
 Cleveland News.Net – serves Greater Cleveland in the state of Ohio
 Colorado Springs News.Net – focuses on this city in the center of Colorado
 Columbus News.Net – chronicles news from Ohio's capital
 The Dallas News.Net – city and county news from Dallas in Texas
 Denver News.Net – develops news out of the Colorado capital
 Detroit News.Net – news resource for the broader Metro Detroit area
 El Paso News.Net – expands on news from El Paso in West Texas
 Fort Lauderdale News.Net – publishes news from the city and Broward County
 Fort Worth News.Net – comprehensive coverage of Fort Worth in Texas
 Hartford News.Net – features stories from the Connecticut capital
 Honolulu News.Net – highlights local news as well as Oahu and Hawaii headlines
 Houston News.Net – presents online news for the largest city in Texas
 Indianapolis News.Net – breaks news out of Indianapolis and Indiana
 Jacksonville News.Net –digest of news for Florida's largest city
 Kansas City News.Net – local portal for Kansas City, Missouri
 Knoxville News.Net – covers the city and Knoxville metropolitan area
 The Las Vegas News.Net – the company's most visited site, covers Las Vegas, Nevada
 Long Beach News.Net – collates news of the city and Pacific Coast
 Los Angeles News.Net – presents news from around the city and California
 Louisville News.Net – streams city and Kentucky state news 
 Memphis News.Net – focuses on the biggest city on the Mississippi River
 Miami News.Net – news site for Miami, Miami-Dade County and southeastern Florida
 Milwaukee News.Net – zeroes in on the biggest city in Wisconsin
 Minneapolis News.Net – composite portal for the biggest city in Minnesota
 The Nashville News.Net – covers the Tennessee capital  
 New Orleans News.Net – provides city and metropolitan area coverage 
 New York City News.Net – online news publisher for the U.S.'s biggest city
 Oklahoma City News.Net – features headlines from the capital and largest city in Oklahoma
 Omaha News.Net – services the city and the Omaha-Council Bluffs metropolitan area
 Orange County News.Net – dedicated site for Orange County, California
 The Orlando News.Net – news resource for Greater Orlando and Central Florida
 Philadelphia News.Net –  provides news for Philadelphia and Pennsylvania
 Phoenix News.Net – breaks news for and about the Phoenix metropolitan area
 Pittsburgh News.Net – focuses on Pittsburgh, Pennsylvania
 Portland News.Net –reports news from Portland, in the state of Oregon
 Raleigh News.Net – streams news from the North Carolina capital 
 Reno News.Net – online news site for Reno in the state of Nevada
 Sacramento News.Net – news source for the Californian capital 
 Salt Lake City News.Net – services the Salt Lake City metropolitan area
 The San Antonio News.Net – reviews news of the second biggest city in Texas
 San Diego News.Net – breaks news from the city and Southern California
 San Francisco News.Net – news portal for San Francisco and the Bay Area
 San Jose News.Net – updates news from the largest city in Northern California
 Santa Barbara News.Net – covers the West Coast city and county
 Seattle News.Net – covers Seattle and the state of Washington
 Silicon Valley News.Net – news resource for the world's technology capital in Santa Clara Valley
 St Louis News.Net – streams news from the city and Missouri
 The St Petersburg News.Net – servicing St. Petersburg on the Florida west coast 
 The Tampa News.Net – tracks news in the city and wider Tampa Bay Area
 Tucson News.Net – provides updates from Tucson in Arizona
 The Tulsa News.Net – features news from Tulsa, Oklahoma
 Tuscaloosa News.Net – online news site for this Alabama city
 Virginia Beach News.Net – portal covering the most populous city in Virginia
 Washington DC News.Net – local news portal intermixed with national coverage

eNewspapers

Regional news distribution
 Africa Leader – covers the continent and major cities and countries of Africa
 Arab Herald – covers Arab speaking and Arab culture countries including GCC members
 Asia Bulletin – dedicated to the Asian region as a whole as well as individual countries
 Asia Pacific Star – focuses on China, Japan, the Korean Peninsula, Taiwan, the Philippines, and Oceania
 Caribbean Herald – links news from island nations in the Caribbean including Haiti, the Bahamas, Barbados, El Salvador, and Cuba
 Central Asia Times – features news from the former Soviet states with names ending with "stan" as well as Mongolia
 Europe Sun – a resource for news of the European Union and member nations
 Herald Globe – The group's international publication covering world news and business
 Middle East Star – monitors the Israeli–Palestinian conflict and other topics relevant to the region
 Scandinavia Times – regional resource for countries in northern Europe
 South America Times – presents stories from around the region
 Southeast Asia Post – news from around Southeast Asia including from Vietnam, Cambodia, Nepal, Thailand, Singapore and Indonesia

National news distribution

 Afghanistan Sun – covers the country nationally and from an international perspective
 Argentina Star – includes major coverage from the capital Buenos Aires and other cities
 Australian Herald – national publication with coverage of Sydney, Melbourne, Perth, Brisbane, Adelaide, and the capital Canberra
 Bangladesh Sun – has its main emphasis on the country, Dhaka the capital, and the Southeast Asia region
 Barbados Bulletin – national news service for the island nation
 Belgium Sun – covers the capital Brussels and Western Europe
 Brazil Sun – features news from across the country including São Paulo, the Federal capital Brasília, and Rio de Janeiro
 Cambodian Times – covering the Kingdom of Cambodia (formerly Kampuchea), with a main focus on the capital and largest city, Phnom Penh
 Canada Standard – national service with news from the major cities Toronto, Vancouver, Montreal and Quebec
 China National News – covers the nation and provinces Hong Kong and Macau
 Chile Sun – news portal for the South American country
 Denmark Sun – updates Kingdom of Denmark news 
 Dutch Sun – all the headlines from the Netherlands
 Germany Sun – provides readers with national bulletins
 Greek Herald – the main emphasis of this newspaper is on the Greek economy and events in Athens
 Haiti Sun – country portal with some coverage of other Caribbean nations
 India Gazette – national publication named after newspaper first published in 1780
 Iran Herald – claims to report independent news from and about the Islamic Republic of Iran
 Iraq Sun – publishes breaking news from across the nation and the capital Baghdad
 Irish Sun – covers Ireland, named after Dublin newspaper of 1880
 Israel Herald – news of the Jewish state with emphasis on the Middle East conflict
 Jamaican Times – displays news of the country and its largest city and capital Kingston
 Japan Herald – coverage of Japan and its bigger cities including Tokyo and Osaka
 Kenya Star – national coverage with substantial content related to events in Nairobi
 Madagascar Sun –news of this nation off the coast of East Africa
 Malaysia Sun – breaks news from around the country and nearby islands
 Mediterranean Times – site's slogan is ‘Connecting the Dots’
 Mexico Star – national stories together with news of Mexican interest from abroad
 Myanmar Sun – incorporating historic Burma Sun 
 Nepal National – long time English language resource for Nepal and its capital Kathmandu
 New Zealand Star – covers the North Island and South Island with national and local news
 Nigeria Sun – presents news for the Federal Republic of Nigeria
 North Korea Times – claims to be the oldest news website covering North Korea
 Northern Ireland News – national news resource 
 Pakistan Telegraph – originates and sources news for the country and cities like Karachi, Lahore and Islamabad
 Philippine Times – portal devoted to news about the Philippines, in particular Manila
 Poland Sun – publication for this Central European nation
 Russia Herald – features stories from around the nation and international articles pertinent to Russia
 Scotland Star – online newspaper Scots are waking up to
 Sierra Leone Times – Freetown-focused site with some focus on the West African region
 Singapore Star – portal concentrating on Singapore, uses The surprise of Asia as a slogan
 Sri Lanka Source – presents topical coverage of events in Sri Lanka and the capital Colombo
 Sweden Sun – incorporating Swedish Life, an inside look
 Switzerland Times – slogan is ‘the call of the Swiss’
 Taiwan Sun – covers the island nation internally, its relationship with China, and the Asia-Pacific region
 Thailand Herald – promoted as the star of Siam
 Trinidad Times – a site dedicated to Trinidad & Tobago with some regional coverage
 The UK News – regional site with the main focus on England
 The US News – breaks national news and stories of US interest from around the world
 Venezuela Star – reports breaking news from Venezuela and its capital Caracas
 Vietnam Tribune – long-established portal focused on Vietnam and its capital Hanoi
 Zimbabwe Star – news portal servicing Zimbabwe which became independent from the UK in 1980

City wise news distribution

 Albuquerque Express – covering Albuquerque in New Mexico
 Atlanta Leader – focuses on Atlanta, has the slogan You can rely on the Leader
 Auckland Sun – composite site for New Zealand's biggest city 
 Austin Globe – predominantly news of the Texan capital with some state coverage
 Baltimore Star – a news portal for Baltimore, Maryland
 Baton Rouge Post – primarily based on Baton Rouge with stories from around Louisiana
 BC Post – serving the province of British Columbia 
 Beijing Bulletin – composite news site for the northern China metropolis
 Belfast Bulletin – news resource for the Northern Ireland capital 
 Birmingham News – updates news from UK's second biggest city 
 Birmingham Star – covers the city, and the state of Alabama
 Boston Star – Boston, named after the Boston Daily Star of 1845
 Brisbane Star – focus is on the city and Queensland  
 Bristol Star – relays news of the city and South West England 
 Buffalo Breeze – publication centers around the city, and the state of New York
 Calgary Monitor – city & regional resource  
 Cape Town Express – online service for the city and Western Cape 
 Cardiff Star –  all-embracing portal for the Welsh capital 
 Central Coast News – focuses from Point Mugu to Monterey Bay, CA 
 Charlotte Star – covers Charlotte and the state of North Carolina
 Chicago Chronicle – Chicago portal named after newspaper first published in 1880
 Cincinnati Sun – the voice of Cincinnati together with national and international news
 Cleveland Star – focuses on Cleveland with state coverage of Ohio
 Dallas Sun – Dallas publication with slogan Where the sun never sets
 Denver Sun – covering Denver, Colorado, publication claims to be the Gateway to the Rockies
 Detroit Star – news from around Detroit with segments from Michigan
 Dublin News – online newspaper version of a Dublin (Ireland) newspaper of 1858
 Hong Kong Herald – reports the news from the densely populated province of Hong Kong
 Houston Mirror – Houston, Texas, publication named after a newspaper published in 1928
 Indianapolis Post – covering Indianapolis, has same name as 1927 newspaper
 Johannesburg Life – coverage from the biggest city in South Africa 
 Kansas City Post – Kansas City, Missouri publication named after newspaper produced in 1906
 Knoxville Times – similar named newspaper of 1932 preceded this publication focused on Knoxville, Tennessee
 Kolkata Sun – captures news in the West Bengal capital 
 Kuala Lumpur Times – covers the city and nation 
 Las Vegas Herald – covers Las Vegas, the gaming capital of the world, and the state of Nevada
 Leeds Times – resource for Leeds and West Yorkshire 
 Liverpool Star – insight into life in North West England  
 London Mercury – carries on a newspaper tradition first established in 1682 in London, England
 Long Beach Star – beacon for the city and Southern California 
 Los Angeles Herald – based on a traditional newspaper first published in 1900
 Manila Metro – latest developments from the Philippines capital  
 Memphis Sun – presents news from Memphis, Tennessee
 Mexico City Sun – publishes news of the Mexican capital 
 Miami Mirror – news portal reporting on Miami and Miami-Dade County, Florida
 Milwaukee Sun – named after Milwaukee, Wisconsin newspaper of 1924
 Nashville Herald – Nashville, Tennessee portal named after 1831 newspaper
 Moscow Inquirer – city and national news monitor 
 Munich Metro – covers the capital of German state Bavaria 
 New Orleans Sun – inspired by 1838 newspaper servicing New Orleans
 New York Telegraph – publishes news from and about New York City like its newspaper predecessor of 1845
 Oakland Times – publishes news of Oakland, California 
 Oklahoma City Sun – covering Oklahoma City
 Orange County Sun – online news publication for Californian county 
 Orlando Echo – online newspaper focusing on Orlando and southeastern Florida
 Paris Guardian – covers Paris, France with European and international segments
 Perth Herald – news portal for Perth, the West Australian capital
 Peking Press – comprehensive site focused on Beijing and mainland China
 Philadelphia Herald – displays news from around Philadelphia
 Phoenix Herald – generates news coverage of the city and the state of Arizona
 Pittsburgh Star – covers the city and Pennsylvania state
 Raleigh Times – online news site adopting the name of an 1848 Raleigh, North Carolina newspaper
 Rio de Janeiro Sun – relays the latest developments from Rio 
 Sacramento Sun – streams news of Sacramento, California similar to its newspaper predecessor of 1848
 Salt Lake City Sun – services Salt Lake City in Utah
 San Antonio Post – covers San Antonio
 San Diego Sun – publishing San Diego, California news using the name of a newspaper started in 1881
 San Francisco Star – portal with the name of a San Francisco newspaper of 1851
 San Jose Sun – focuses on San Jose, Silicon Valley and the Bay Area
 Santa Barbara Post – continual news of the ‘American Riviera’ 
 Seattle Bulletin – online version of similarly named newspaper produced in 1903
 Shanghai Sun – composite news portal devoted to China's largest city
 St Louis Star – St Louis, Missouri publication with the slogan Striving, seeking and unyielding
 St Petersburg Star – all the news from the Russian cultural capital  
 Sydney Sun – publication with the title of a newspaper founded in 1910 in Sydney
 Tampa Star – serving Tampa and Hillsborough County, Florida
 Toronto Telegraph – focusing on the largest city in Canada, in the province of Ontario
 Tucson Post – named after a 1901 newspaper, the site covers Tucson, Arizona
 Tuscaloosa Times – Tuscaloosa, Alabama publication named after an 1872–1899 newspaper
 Vancouver Star – covering Vancouver, British Columbia and Canada with the slogan The voice of reason
 Yorkshire Observer – named after a historic newspaper of the 1800s

US states news distribution
 Arizona Herald – provides state coverage with news of Phoenix, Tucson and other large cities
 California Telegraph – covers California with a focus on Los Angeles, San Francisco and San Diego
 Colorado Star – Colorado publication with the slogan Till our great mountain rivers run dry
 Florida Statesman – state news portal for Florida and its major cities and towns
 Illinois Intelligencer – current news from around the state
 Hawaii Telegraph – services the Hawaiian Islands with a particular emphasis on Oahu
 Maine Mirror – Maine publication with the slogan Where America's day begins
 Maryland Leader – provides state coverage with appreciable coverage of Baltimore
 Massachusetts Sun – portal featuring news from around Massachusetts
 Michigan Sun – generates statewide news coverage of Michigan and its major cities
 New Jersey Telegraph – features news of Newark, Jersey City and New Jersey state
 New York Statesman – servicing the state of New York
 North Carolina Daily – portal featuring state news from North Carolina
 Ohio Standard – a resource for news of Ohio and the state's larger cities
 Oklahoma Star – has the slogan Oklahoma's own, covers Oklahoma state
 Oregon Telegraph – news site updating headlines from across Oregon
 Pennsylvania Sun – providing statewide coverage and news of bigger cities in Pennsylvania
 Tennessee Daily – online newspaper with the slogan Tennessee at its best
 Texas Guardian – covers Texas, with a focus on Dallas, Houston, and Austin
 Utah Independent – focuses on Utah state with much of its coverage of Salt Lake City
 Wisconsin Star – covers Wisconsin from the capital Madison to its largest city Milwaukee

Other news distribution platforms
 Breaking Property News – a global real estate journal
 Broadcast Communications – a news resource for the broadcasting and communications industries
 Business Sun – an international news resource focusing on business and finance
 Entertainment Sun – news portal for the show business industry
 International Technology – covers news of technology from around the world
 International Travel News – travel news resource, has the slogan With footprints around the globe
 Manufacturing Mirror – focuses on news in manufacturing and textiles
 Professional Autos – reports on events in the automotive industry
 Sports Sun – general sports news site with an international perspective
 Tennis Times –  devoted to the sport of tennis, has the slogan Game, set, match
 Travel Trade. Org – designed to cater for travel industry professionals

References

External links
Official website

News agencies based in the United Arab Emirates
1998 establishments in the United Arab Emirates
Publishing companies established in 1998